Neil Hamburger is a fictional standup comedian and singer created by Australian-American entertainer Gregg Turkington. Distinguished for his misanthropic jokes and anti-comedy style, Turkington has released a number of albums as Hamburger and has appeared as the character in various films, television shows, and other media. In 2015, the act inspired the feature-length film Entertainment, which stars Turkington as a "variant" of the character.

Turkington developed the character in the 1990s and originally envisioned the concept as a "weird recording project". It originated from a prank call that had appeared on the album Great Phone Calls Featuring Neil Hamburger (1992). He followed the LP with three more albums issued on Drag City Records before he began receiving offers to perform as the character for live shows. His albums Neil Hamburger Sings Country Winners (2009) and First of Dismay (2014) feature original songs and cover versions backed by "The Too Good For Neil Hamburger Band".

Style
Hamburger's live act, which is quite different from his many albums, features a barrage of question/answer jokes aimed often at celebrity targets as well as barbs aimed at his ex-wife. The confrontational aspects of his act drew comparisons to Tony Clifton. One of his gags is "Zipper Lips", in which he asks an audience member a question. If the audience member doesn't respond, Hamburger derides them for being a "zipper lips". A common phrase used by the comedian is "But that's my life!", which he uses when he mentions being humiliated or degraded for some reason.

Career

Turkington's first Neil Hamburger recordings were self-recorded, imagining an unfunny, poorly recorded self-released stand-up comedy act. Turkington used recordings to audience laughter that were intentionally out of sync with his jokes, to replicate the private pressing albums by outsider artists that he enjoyed. These early recordings found a cult audience, which led to record label Drag City issuing his album America's Funnyman in 1996. Several more albums were issued on the record label.

After originally conceiving Hamburger to be a studio-only character, Turkington was convinced to perform as the character on stage. His first shows were supporting punk rock band Frenzal Rhomb, who flew Turkington from the United States to Australia especially for the performance. Neil Hamburger would later appear in the music videos for the songs "Ballchef" and "Punisher" from Frenzal Rhomb's 2003 album Sans Souci.

Hamburger was a frequent guest on the Internet talk show Tom Green's House Tonight (2006–2013). In 2006, Hamburger started doing his own show called Poolside Chats with Neil Hamburger on The Channel at Tomgreen.com. Guests on his show have included Tim and Eric, Kyle Gass of Tenacious D, Buzz Osborne of the Melvins, and Bonnie 'Prince' Billy.

In 2006, Hamburger had a brief cameo appearance in the film Tenacious D in the Pick of Destiny. Over the next year, he opened for Tenacious D during their Pick of Destiny Tour.  However, his performances incited mostly negative reactions, with booing and heckling ensuing in countries such as Ireland and England. His performance at Madison Square Garden was referred to by Sia Michel of The New York Times as likely "the greatest night of his career."

In 2008, Drag City released an album of country and western originals and covers recorded by Hamburger. During the sessions, Hamburger was backed by musicians including Prairie Prince of The Tubes and Todd Rundgren's band, David Gleason, Atom Ellis of Dieselhed and the New Cars, Rachel Haden from That Dog.

In December 2010, Special Entertainment released an iPhone App called Shaky Advice from Neil Hamburger that functions much like a Magic 8 Ball, with 30 video clips of Hamburger giving comical advice.

In 2015, the Neil Hamburger act was dramatized for the Rick Alverson film Entertainment. In it, the character is shown repeatedly on and offstage; as well as the life of a fictional portrayal of the man behind the act separate from the real Gregg Turkington. The film's script was written by Turkington, Alverson, and comedian Tim Heidecker, although the dialogue was improvised.

In 2021, Neil Hamburger won "Best Guest Host" of Tim Heidecker's podcast Office Hours.

Discography

Albums 
 Great Phone Calls Featuring Neil Hamburger  (1992)
 America's Funnyman (1996)
 Raw Hamburger (1998)
 Left for Dead in Malaysia (1999)
 50 States, 50 Laughs (2000)
 Laugh Out Lord (2002)
 Great Moments at Di Presa's Pizza House (2005)
 Hot February Night (2007)
 Neil Hamburger Sings Country Winners (2008)
 Live At Third Man (2012)
 Incident in Cambridge, Massachusetts (2012)
 First of Dismay (2014)
 Still Dwelling (2019)

EPs 
Looking for Laughs EP – Amarillo Records (1994)
Bartender, the Laugh's on Me!!!! EP – Planet Pimp Records (1995)
Open Ended Interview with Neil Hamburger (promotional 7-inch) – Drag City (1997)
Neil Hamburger Pays Tribute to Diana, Princess of Wales EP – Planet Pimp Records (1997)
Inside Neil Hamburger EP – Drag City (2000)
Hamburger Remembers Nixon 7-inch – I Don't Feel a Thing Records (2002)
Souvenir Record (tour split 7-inch with Pleaseeasaur) (2008)
American Exports 7-inch (with the Hard-Ons) – Red Lounge Records (2009), reissued by Alternative Tentacles (2011)
 Alive (With Pleasure) (bootleg 7-inch) (2012)
 A Bruise Cruise Souvenir Record 7-inch – Bruise Cruise Records (2012)

Appearances 
RRRecords – America the Beautiful (compilation) (on "That's My Life") (1994)
Planet Pimp Records – Good Tyme Jhambhoree (compilation)  (on "Promo Spot #1" and "Promo Spot #2") (1995)
Amarillo Records – You Gan't Boar Like an Eabla When you Work with Turkrys (on "Looking for Laughs" and "Great Phone Calls") (1996)
Giardia – Muckraker #8 (compilation) (on "Ten Minutes after Checking into the Motel 6") (1997)
Tedium House – My Baby Does Good Sculptures (compilation) (on "Comedy Fated from the Stars") (1997)
The Phantom Surfers – XXX Party (on "Special Guest Guffaws") (2000)
Mark Prindle – Only the Good Die Young: An All-Star Tribute to Mark Prindle (1973–2058) (on "Special Celebrity Endorsement") (2001)
Joe Beats – Indie Rock Blues (on "It's Expected I'm Gone / Open Ended Interview") (2005)
Comedy Central – Comedy Death-Ray (compilation) (on "Neil Hamburger") (2008)

Filmography

DVDs
 The Show Must Go Off!: Neil Hamburger Live at the Phoenix Greyhound Park (2003)
 The World's Funnyman (2006)
 Western Music and Variety (2009)

Movie appearances
 Circuit 8: Volume 8 (as himself) (2001)
 The Amazing Adventures of Pleaseeasaur (as himself) (2006)
 Tenacious D in The Pick of Destiny (as himself) (2006)
 Coco Lipshitz: Behind the Laughter (as himself) (2009)
 The Comedy (as himself) (2012)
 Hamlet A.D.D. (as Osric) (2014)
 Entertainment (an interpretation of the character) (2015)
 Mr. Bungle: The Night They Came Home (as himself) (2020)

Television appearances
 Free Radio (VH1)
 Jimmy Kimmel Live! (ABC)
 Red Eye with Greg Gutfeld (Fox News)
 Tom Green Live! (ManiaTV!)
 Tom Green's House Tonight (The Comedy Network)
 Tim and Eric Awesome Show, Great Job! (Adult Swim)
 Tim and Eric Nite Live! (Super Deluxe)
 The New Big Ball with Neil Hamburger (Adult Swim)
 The Comedy Can Television Series (The Comedy Network)
 The Movie Show (SBS One)
 Recovery (ABC Australia)
 Special Sauce (Starz)

Music video appearances
 "Conspiracy of the Gods" (Trans Am, 2007)

See also
Poolside Chats

References

External links

Neil Hamburger's "Unofficial" Site

Comedy theatre characters
Male characters in theatre
Theatre characters introduced in 1992
Drag City (record label) artists
Alternative Tentacles artists
Fictional comedians